The Power and the Myth is the fourth studio album and the first since the reunion, by House of Lords, released on August 3, 2004.

The album marks the return of original members Chuck Wright, Lanny Cordola and Ken Mary, but is the first not to feature keyboardist, main songwriter and founding member Gregg Giuffria.

Then Mr. Big drummer Pat Torpey co-wrote many of the songs on the album.

Track listing
 "Today" (McCubbin, Ross, Domen Vajevec, Martin) – 4:44
 "All Is Gone" (Ken Mary, Pat Torpey, Wychoff, Lanny Cordola, Chuck Wright) – 3:56
 "Am I the Only One" (Torpey, Cordola, Wright) – 3:29
 "Living in Silence" (James Christian, Mary, Torpey, Cordola, Wright) – 5:05
 "The Power and the Myth" (Mary, Cordola, Wright) – 3:22
 "The Rapture" (Cordola, Wright) – 3:21
 "The Man Who I Am" (McCubbin, Ross, Vajevec, Martin) – 4:35
 "Bitter Sweet Euphoria" (Phil Bardowell, Christian, Mary, Torpey, Cordola, Wright) – 3:57
 "Mind Trip" (Mary, Torpey, Cordola, Wright) – 5:08
 "Child of Rage" (Christian, Cordola, Wright) – 5:53
 "Havana" (Christian, Gregg Giuffria, Tim Pierce, Mark Spiro) [Japanese bonus track] – 3:47

Personnel
James Christian – lead vocals, guitar
Lanny Cordola – guitar
Chuck Wright – bass
Ken Mary – drums

Additional musicians
Derek Sherinian – keyboards
Ricky Phillips – keyboards
Allan Okuye – keyboards
Robin Beck – backing vocals
Sandra Stevens – backing vocals

External links
[ Billboard.com]

2004 albums
House of Lords (band) albums
Frontiers Records albums